Morris P. Glushien (October 15, 1909 - May 19, 2006) was an American labor lawyer.  He resigned in 1947 from the National Labor Relations Board in protest due to the Taft-Hartley Act and then acted as counsel to the International Ladies Garment Workers Union.  In 1957 he argued the landmark free-speech case Staub v. Baxley before the Supreme Court of the United States and won.

He was the father of the international lawyer Ruth Wedgwood.

External links
 http://www.vaue160.org/union/modules/wfsection/article.php?articleid=168
 https://www.washingtonpost.com/wp-dyn/content/article/2006/05/25/AR2006052502032.html
 http://www.boston.com/news/globe/obituaries/articles/2006/05/27/morris_glushien_champion_of_fair_labor_practices_at_96/

1909 births
2006 deaths
American labor lawyers
National Labor Relations Board officials
20th-century American lawyers